Huhtamäki Oyj (styled Huhtamaki) is a Finnish consumer packaging company whose production includes food packaging, disposable containers, as well as egg cartons and fruit packaging for quick service restaurants, coffee shops, retail stores, caterers and vending operators. It operates globally and is headquartered in Espoo, Finland.

According to Talouselämä magazine, in 2021, Huhtamaki was the 22nd largest company in Finland in terms of turnover.

The parent company Huhtamäki Oyj is listed on Nasdaq Helsinki Ltd.

History
Huhtamaki was initially established as a manufacturer of confectionery but eventually it became an industrial conglomerate and after that a global consumer packaging company. The company started their first packaging division in 1965.

O. Y. Huhtamäen Tehtaat (1920–1933)
Huhtamaki was established when 20-year-old Heikki Huhtamäki founded the “O. Y. Huhtamäen Tehtaat - A. B. Huhtamäkis Fabriker” in Kokkola in 1920. Huhtamäki, who was born into a baker family, had gone to Russian Empire at the age of 16 to study caramel manufacturing, but was arrested and sent to Siberia during the revolution. He escaped from there via China to Japan and then back to Finland. The Kokkola factory employed 60 people and the initial capital for it came from his new father-in-law, a prosperous leather manufacturer whose daughter was Signe Hagström.

Huhtamäki-Hellas Oy (1934–1939)
Huhtamaki acquired Hellas in 1932 and in 1934 Huhtamäen Tehtaat and “Makeistehdas Hellas Oy” merged into “Huhtamäki-Hellas Oy”. Rudolf Gardberg, who incorporated Hellas in 1910, had been making sweets in Turku since 1899. The company was the second largest confectionery factory in Finland. Huhtamaki served as the company’s managing director until 1935, when he resigned and took over the management of bread factory Ipnos. He also worked in the canned foods factory Jalostaja. Huhtamaki sold Huhtamäki-Hellas Oy’s shares and started competing with it by expanding Ipnos’ range of sweets. In the first year of Ipnos, the company started designing the Budapest chocolate confectionery. Ipnos invested in packaging design; they were very diverse in form and special in design. The packaging was largely handmade.

Huhtamaki bought back Huhtamäki-Hellas.

Huhtamäki-yhtymä Oy (1940–1975)
In 1940, Huhtamaki merged Ipnos, Jalostaja and Huhtamäki-Hellas into Huhtamäki-yhtymä Oy. During the war years, Ipnos began to focus on macaroni and biscuit production instead of sweets.

Huhtamäki, who had started in poor conditions, felt that it was wrong for a large fortune to benefit only a few. In the 1930s and 1940s, he made donations, and in 1943 the Finnish Cultural Foundation was gifted the majority of Huhtamäki-yhtymä’s shares. Five per cent of the Group’s shares were also donated to the University of Turku and the Workers’ Academy (Työväen Akatemia). Huhtamäki continued to head the company and Erkki Partanen, a 28-year-old law graduate, started as his administrative assistant. Partanen became a key figure in the company when Huhtamäki’s strength began to diminish in the 1940s.

Huhtamaki expanded its operations in the 1940s to wholesale in healthcare. In 1946, it established the RaNa subsidiary to manufacture health-enhancing products. Marli Oy, a beverage factory that manufactured berry wines, was also purchased in the same year.

In 1949, the pharmaceutical business was incorporated into the pharmaceutical company Leiras, which sold medicines manufactured by Schering AG.

Erkki Partanen was appointed managing director in 1952 and company headquarters was moved from Turku to Helsinki.

The company was listed on the Helsinki Stock Exchange in 1959.

In 1960, the meat processing company Mensa was purchased, which made sausages, canned foods and metal and cardboard packaging. The Group set up its own pharmaceutical factory, which was at the same time the first pharmaceutical factory in Finland. In 1961, Leiras launched birth control pills. The manufacture of disposable containers began in 1962. Mensa’s cardboard packaging line was incorporated in 1965 into a subsidiary called Polarpak. Its first products included cardboard mugs and butter containers which were equipped with plastic lids.

The founder of the company, Heikki Huhtamäki, died in 1970. Over the last decade, he was no longer involved in the management of the company. His motto is said to have been “Well packaged – half sold.” After Huhtamäki, Erkki Partanen and Asko Tarkka acted as managing directors.

In the 1970s, Huhtamäki-yhtymä Oy was a conglomerate that operated in approximately 20 different business sectors. In 1972, the company’s goal was to increase exports. In 1973, Huhtamaki acquired Pyrkijä Oy, which manufactured plastic packaging and products. Polarpak started making yogurt jars and built a plastics factory in Hämeenlinna in 1974.

Huhtamäki Oyj (1975–1998)
In 1975, the company was renamed Huhtamäki Oyj. In 1975, Partanen was succeeded by Asko Tarkka, whose first task was to cut costs by reducing personnel, among other things. An industrial house specialising in the plastics industry was opened for Pyrkijä.

In the 1980s, Huhtamäki Oyj began to focus its operations on four main industries and sold a large number of its operating units. Disposable containers were delivered to the 1980 Moscow Olympics and Polarpak became Europe’s leading manufacturer of disposable cups.

In 1983, Huhtamäki Oyj acquired Leaf in the United States. At the time, the transaction was the largest ever in Finland and it doubled the company’s turnover. The packaging business in Asia was started in 1984 and Pyrkijä was sold to Suunto.

In 1985, the pharmaceutical manufacturer Medica was purchased, later also Star and Rohto. The pharmaceutical companies formed Huhtamäki Oy Lääketeollisuus.

In 1987, the company acquired Bellaplasta. Polarpak became Polarcup in 1988. Fast food culture spread in Europe, raising the demand for different kinds of packaging.

In 1989, the name Hellas was changed to Leaf and the Group’s pharmaceutical companies were named Huhtamäki Oy Leiras. The pharmaceutical wholesaler was sold. Timo Peltola took over as managing director after Asko Tarkka.

Marli and Jalostaja were sold in 1992 and Leiras Oy was incorporated.

In 1995, the company had three business areas: pharmaceuticals, the confectionery industry and packaging. It was not easy to decide which area to focus on. The solution was influenced by the fact that the product liability of contraceptive products caused difficulties for the pharmaceutical industry in the United States and that the confectionery industry had not managed to become the market leader in the sector. The following year Huhtamaki sold 40 per cent of its business operations. At the beginning of the year, the loss-making American collectible-card business was sold. In July, Leiras was sold to the German pharmaceutical group Schering AG. Part of Leaf was sold to the American company Hershey. In the same year, the company also acquired 14 packaging companies. In 1997, Polarcup accounted for approximately half of the Group’s turnover, more than 3 billion Finnish markkas.

In 1998, Polarcup was operating in 30 countries and was the market leader in Europe and Asia-Pacific. Operations in China, India and Russia began in the 1990s. In March 1998, Huhtamaki acquired the cardboard packaging and systems operations from Sealright in the United States, as well as the their operations in Australia. Sealright was the market leader in ice cream packaging in the United States.

Huhtamäki Van Leer Oyj (1999–2001)

In 1999, the company again sold 40 per cent of its business operations. In April, Leaf was sold to the Dutch company CSM. In May, Huhtamaki announced that it had made an offer for the Dutch company Royal Packaging Industries Van Leer. Van Leer had almost three times the turnover of Huhtamaki. The company was renamed Huhtamäki Van Leer Oyj.

By October 2000, the company had divested almost half of Van Leer’s operations. For example, the Van Leer Industrial group, which manufactures industrial packaging, was sold to Greif Brothers in the United States.

Huhtamäki Oyj (2001–)
In 2001, the company changed its name back to Huhtamäki Oyj.

In 2004, Peltola retired at the age of 58. Heikki Takanen took over as CEO in September.

CEO Jukka Moisio started in April 2008. The company decided to focus on food packaging, cups, egg cartons and North America. Between 2009 and 2014, eight companies were sold. In 2010, for example, the hard plastic packaging business was sold to the European company Island Lux S.à r.l. & Partners S.C.A.

In 2011, after a 10-year break, the company started to make acquisitions again with the aim of complementing its own production and expanding market areas. In 2011–2016, 13 companies were acquired.

In March 2012, Huhtamaki acquired Josco, a Chinese manufacturer of disposable containers and serving packages. After the purchase, Huhtamaki had 12 production facilities in Asia. In August, the company acquired Winterfield, a manufacturer of disposable containers based in the United States.

In spring 2019, Charles Héaulmé took over as CEO Moisio’s successor after having been the Director of Europe and Central Asia at Tetra Pak. Under Moisio’s management, the company’s share price had risen from 6 Euros to over 30 Euros.

In 2021, Huhtamaki acquired Elif, a flexible packaging manufacturer based in Turkey and Egypt, and Hihio-Art Packaging, a Chinese company that manufactured paper bags, wrapping papers and folding boxboard packaging. Russia’s share of the turnover was less than three per cent.

In January 2022, Huhtamaki acquired the joint venture it had established in 2018 with the Polish Smith Anderson Group. Huhtamäki Smith Anderson had manufactured paper bags in Czeladź. Huhtamaki’s CEO Héaulmé went on sick leave. CFO Thomas Geust acted as his substitute until 19 April. After the start of the war in Ukraine, the company ceased Russian investments and suspended the start-up of its fourth factory in Russia. In mid-April, the company decided to start selling its Russian operations.

Organization

In 2022, Huhtamaki had four reporting segments:
Fiber Packaging,
Foodservice Europe-Asia-Oceania, which manufactures drinking cups, plates, wrappings, trays, cutlery and take-away packaging for food service providers in Europe, Asia and Oceania such as fast food restaurants, restaurants and cafes, among others
North America supplies its customers in North America with cups, take-away packaging and printed cardboard consumer packaging. Brands in the segment include Chinet.
Flexible Packaging focuses on the flexible packaging it supplies to the food and beverage industry in Europe, Asia, Oceania and South America. Products include packaging materials, bags and stickers, for example. Customers also include companies focused on pet food, and hygiene and home-care products.

In 2021, Huhtamaki had 18,400 employees and 79 production facilities, located in countries such as Poland, Russia, Ukraine, Spain, Ireland, the United Kingdom, Turkey, Saudi Arabia, South Africa, India, China, Malaysia, Australia and the United States. One of the facilities is located in the Nordic countries. The Hämeenlinna factory produces, for example, cardboard cups, ice-cream packaging, salad boxes and disposable plates. The Nordic countries employ approximately 300 people. Huhtamäki's North American operations are based within the Kansas City Metropolitan Area in De Soto, Kansas.

Shareholders
Huhtamaki’s ten largest shareholders (31 March 2022):
 Finnish Cultural Foundation
 Huhtamäki Oyj
 Varma Mutual Pension Insurance Company
 Ilmarinen Mutual Pension Insurance Company
 Holding Manutas Oy
 Elo Mutual Pension Insurance Company
 Society of Swedish Literature in Finland
 Security Trading Oy
 OP-Finland
 The State Pension Fund of Finland

Foreign ownership including nominee registered shares: 45.57%.

Products

Huhtamaki’s products include food packaging, disposable containers, as well as egg and fruit packaging. Its disposable tableware, such as cups, plates and containers are made from paper and plastic and used in quick service restaurants, coffee shops, retail stores, caterers and vending operators. They are also used for packaging ice cream and pet food. In 2017, for example, the company produced 18 billion drinking cups every year and one billion eggs were packed into its cartons every week. Packaging accounts for approximately 2–3 per cent of the price of the finished product.

The company has developed new products such as paper-based pharmaceutical tablet packaging and fibre-based ice cream and yogurt cups, as well as coffee cup lids. Egg cartons are made using recycled paper and hay fibre. For the packaging of beauty products and food, it has developed tube laminates.

Huhtamaki’s drinking cups are made from three different types of cardboard:
 traditional polyethylene-coated board
 compostable paperboard and
 plant-based Future Smart board with plant-based plastic coating.

Market
In 2017, the company’s largest markets were the United States, Germany, India, the United Kingdom and China. Its customers included Costco, Mars, McDonald’s, Nestlé, Starbucks and Unilever.

Corporate responsibility
Huhtamaki strives to be a pioneer in sustainable development in the packaging industry. The company’s goal is to achieve carbon-neutral production by 2030 and the transition to using renewable electricity only. In 2020, Huhtamaki set targets for mitigation of climate change, which were adopted by the Science Based Targets initiative the following year. It intends to reduce both its direct and electricity emissions and those related to the final disposal of products. The company is committed to purchasing most of its products and services from companies that are committed to the Science Based Targets initiative. By 2030, all of its products will be designed to be recycled, compostable or reusable.

Recognitions
 Introduced in 1935, the Budapest chocolate confectionery’s carton package won the recognition of a so-called Star package at an international packaging exhibition in London.
 In 1945, Heikki Huhtamäki became Finland’s youngest Vuorineuvos (an honorary title granted by the President of the Republic of Finland). Also his successors Erkki Partanen, Asko Tarkka and Timo Peltola were awarded the same honorary title.
 In December 2021, the World Packaging Organization WPO awarded the ice cream portion package designed by Huhtamäki for McDonald’s in the Sustainability Awards series.
 Huhtamaki made the Financial Times’ Europe’s Climate Leaders list in 2022.

See also
Huhtamaki PPL

References

External links 

Manufacturing companies based in Espoo
Companies listed on Nasdaq Helsinki
Packaging companies of Finland
Finnish brands
Manufacturing companies established in 1920
1920 establishments in Finland